The A1B reactor is an aircraft carrier nuclear reactor developed by the United States Navy. It is used in Gerald R. Ford–class aircraft carriers to provide electrical and propulsion energy. The A1B is the first naval reactor produced by Bechtel Corporation, which has "performed engineering and/or construction services on more than 80 percent of [land-based] nuclear plants in the United States". 

Aircraft carriers' nuclear reactors provide the electrical and motor energy of the ship by splitting enriched uranium to produce heat and convert water to steam to power steam turbines. This process is largely the same as in land-based nuclear power stations, the most notable difference being the direct use of turboshaft power for turning the ship's screws. Over decades of development several other design differences have emerged between naval reactors and the usually much larger power station reactors.

As Navy planners developed requirements for the Gerald R. Ford class, they concluded that the A4W reactors that provide propulsion and electricity for the predecessor Nimitz-class aircraft carriers offer too little power for contemporary and anticipated future shipboard needs, so they commissioned a new reactor from Bechtel. 

The new reactor was named A1B, following the Navy's reactor-designation scheme of type, generation, and manufacturer: A for aircraft carrier, 1 for the maker's first reactor plant design, and B for Bechtel. Two A1B reactor plants will power each Gerald R. Ford class ship.

It is estimated that the thermal power output of each A1B will be around 700 MWth, some 25% more than provided by the A4W. Improved efficiency in the total plant is expected to provide improved output to both propulsion and electrical systems. Using A4W data with a 25% increase in thermal power, the A1B reactors likely produce enough steam to generate  of electricity, plus  from just one reactor to power the four propeller shafts.

The increased electrical generation capacity will allow for elimination of service steam on the ship, reducing staffing requirements for maintenance. Also, the use of electrical aircraft catapults (EMALS) will free the ship's air wing from reactor plant steam constraints, in comparison to the steam catapults used for launching aircraft on Nimitz class carriers, which relied on steam supplied by the nuclear reactor.

The A1B reactor uses modernized technology that is both more advanced and adaptable than previous reactor technology, is smaller and weighs less than the A4W, and has operator interfaces that are expected to be improved as well.

See also
 A4W reactor

References 

United States naval reactors